Megascale engineering (or macro-engineering) is a form of exploratory engineering concerned with the construction of structures on an enormous scale.  Typically these structures are at least  in length—in other words, at least one megameter, hence the name. Such large-scale structures are termed megastructures.

In addition to large-scale structures, megascale engineering is also defined as including the transformation of entire planets into a human-habitable environment, a process known as terraforming or planetary engineering. This might also include transformation of the surface conditions, changes in the planetary orbit, and structures in orbit intended to modify the energy balance.

Astroengineering is the extension of megascale engineering to megastructures on a stellar scale or larger, such as Dyson spheres, Ringworlds, and Alderson disks.

Several megascale structure concepts such as Dyson spheres, Dyson swarms, and Matrioshka brains would likely be built upon space-based solar power satellites.  Other planetary engineering or interstellar transportation concepts would likely require space-based solar power satellites and the accompanying space logistics infrastructure for their power or construction.

Megascale engineering often plays a major part in the plot of science fiction movies and books. The micro-gravity environment of outer space provides several potential benefits for the engineering of these structures. These include minimizing the loads on the structure, the availability of large quantities of raw materials in the form of asteroids, and an ample supply of energy from the Sun. The capabilities to employ these advantages are not yet available, however, so they provide material for science fiction themes.

Quite a few megastructures have been designed on paper as exploratory engineering. However, the list of existing and planned megastructures is complicated by classifying what exactly constitutes a megastructure. By strict definition, no megastructures currently exist (with the space elevator being the only such project under serious consideration). By more lenient definitions, the Great Wall of China counts as a megastructure.

A more complete list of conceptual and existing megastructures, along with a discussion of megastructure criteria, is found under megastructure.

Of all the proposed megastructures, only the orbital elevator, the Lofstrom launch loop, and Martian or lunar space elevator concepts could be built using conventional engineering techniques, and are within the grasp of current material science. Carbon nanotubes may have the requisite tensile strength for the more technologically challenging Earth-based space elevator, but creation of nanotubes of the required length is a laboratory exercise, and adequate cable-scale technology has not yet been shown at all.

The assembly of structures more massive than a space elevator would likely involve a combination of new engineering techniques, new materials, and new technologies. Such massive construction projects might require the use of self-replicating machines to provide a suitably large "construction crew". The use of nanotechnology might provide both the self-replicating assemblers, and the specialized materials needed for such a project. Nanotechnology is, however, another area of speculative exploratory engineering at this time.

See also
 Kardashev scale
 Macro-engineering
 Space manufacturing
 Stellar engineering

References

Megastructures
Engineering projects
Exploratory engineering